Manisan may refer to:

 Manisan (Incheon), a mountain of South Korea
 Manisan (Chungcheongbuk-do), a mountain of South Korea